Get Used to It may refer to:

 "Get Used to It", a 1979 song by Roger Voudouris
 "Get Used to It", a song by Giant from Time to Burn
 "Get Used to It", a song by Justin Bieber from Purpose
 "Get Used to It", a song by Slaughter from Fear No Evil
 Get Used to It!, a 1992 musical by Tom Wilson Weinberg, produced by The Glines
 Get Used to It (Brand New Heavies album)
 Get Used to It (Rhino Bucket album)

See also 
 "Get Use to It", a song by Ice Cube from Raw Footage